Robert Jewell (20 January 1920 – 10 May 1998) was an Australian actor who mostly worked as a Dalek or other robot operator on Doctor Who in the late 1960s, also playing a cameo as Bing Crosby in the serial The Daleks' Master Plan. He later returned to Australia and played small recurring roles in Prisoner during the 1980s. Previous to travelling to England, Robert Jewell was in many stage shows including 'Moomba' in Melbourne and also did skits in 'In Melbourne Tonight'. He was stage manager at 'His Majestys Theatre' in Melbourne where Bert Newton and Toni Lamond performed.

In his later years, he formed a small group who travelled to Aged people's homes and put on performances. His eldest daughter, Sandra Papavasiliou (now Jewell), was interviewed by Spencer Howson of ABC Radio (Brisbane) on the subject of Daleks.

Filmography

Film

Television

References

External links

1920 births
1998 deaths
Australian male television actors
20th-century Australian male actors
Australian male film actors
Place of birth missing